Nazareth Margoschis College, is a general degree college located in Pillaiyanmanai, Thoothukudi district, Tamil Nadu. It was established in the year 1967. The college is affiliated with Manonmaniam Sundaranar University. This college offers different courses in arts, commerce and science.

Departments

Science
Chemistry
Mathematics
Zoology
Computer Application

Arts and Commerce
Tamil
English
History
Commerce

Accreditation
The college is  recognized by the University Grants Commission (UGC).

References

External links
http://www.margoschiscollege.in

Educational institutions established in 1967
1967 establishments in Madras State
Colleges affiliated to Manonmaniam Sundaranar University
Universities and colleges in Thoothukudi district